The House of Lobanov-Rostovsky is a branch of the House of Rurik whose male-line ancestors ruled the Principality of Rostov in present-day Russia.

History 
It originated with Prince Ivan (nicknamed Loban for his wide forehead), who lived at the end of the 15th century and was a great-grandson of Konstantin Vasilyevich, the reigning monarch of Rostov the Great. 

Notable members of the family included:

 Dmitry Ivanovich Lobanov-Rostovsky
 Aleksey Lobanov-Rostovsky
 Nikita Lobanov-Rostovsky, the senior living member of the princely House of Rostov.

Their coat of arms combines the emblems of Kiev and Rostov the Great, two cities their patrilineal ancestors ruled. This princely house owned the Lobanov-Rostovsky Palace in downtown Saint Petersburg.

References 

 
Russian families
Russian noble families